Allison Park is a census-designated place in Allegheny County, Pennsylvania, United States. It is a suburb of Pittsburgh and is located within Hampton, McCandless, Shaler, Indiana and West Deer townships. It had a population of 21,864 at the 2020 census.

History
Allison Park in the 18th century was called Tally Cavey. Tally Cavey was part of the large Pitt Township. The word Talley Cavey is Irish Gaelic for "hill over the borough".  Early Irish settlers named it after Tullycavy on the Ards Peninsula outside Greyabbey, County Down, now in Northern Ireland. The town started in the woods that are now along Mt. Royal Boulevard, and continued until it reached what is now the Pennsylvania Turnpike.

References

Pittsburgh metropolitan area
Census-designated places in Allegheny County, Pennsylvania
Census-designated places in Pennsylvania